Woody Wilson is an American comic strip writer who crafted stories for Rex Morgan, M.D. and Judge Parker over many years. He retired from writing both strips in 2016.

References

American comics writers
Living people
Year of birth missing (living people)
Place of birth missing (living people)
20th-century American writers
21st-century American writers